The Bobby Tully Gymnasium is a 2,500 seat multi-purpose arena, in Tallahassee, Florida, that opened in 1956. It is the home of the Florida State University Seminoles volleyball team. Prior to the Donald L. Tucker Civic Center opening in 1981, it was home to the men's basketball team as well. The arena played host to The Rolling Thunder Revue Tour on April 27, 1976, headed by Bob Dylan.

See also
 Florida State Seminoles

References

External links
Venue information

Indoor arenas in Florida
Florida State Seminoles basketball venues
College volleyball venues in the United States
Sports venues in Tallahassee, Florida
College basketball venues in the United States
1956 establishments in Florida
Sports venues completed in 1956
Defunct college basketball venues in the United States